Vera Zvonareva was the defending champion, but lost in the fourth round to Samantha Stosur.

Jelena Janković won the title, defeating Caroline Wozniacki in the final 6–2, 6–4.

This tournament marked the first WTA main draw appearance of future World No. 3 and US Open Champion Sloane Stephens, who advanced to the second round before losing to Vera Zvonareva.

Seeds
All seeds receive a bye into the second round.

Draw

Finals

Top half

Section 1

Section 2

Section 3

Section 4

Bottom half

Section 5

Section 6

Section 7

Section 8

References

External links
Draw and Qualifying Draw

Bnp Paribas Open - Women's Singles, 2010
2010 BNP Paribas Open
Bnp Paribas Open - Women's Singles, 2010